In Flight is a 1977 studio album by George Benson and was released on the Warner Bros. Records label. It was certified Platinum by the RIAA.

Track listing

Personnel
Adapted from liner notes
 George Benson – lead guitar, vocals
 Jorge Dalto – clavinet, acoustic piano
 Ronnie Foster – electric piano, Minimoog
 Phil Upchurch – rhythm guitar, bass (5, 6)
 Stanley Banks – bass guitar (1-4)
 Harvey Mason – drums
 Ralph MacDonald – percussion
 Claus Ogerman – orchestra arrangements and conductor

Production
 Producer – Tommy LiPuma
 Assistant Producer – Noel Newbolt
 Recorded and Mixed by Al Schmitt at Capitol Studios (Hollywood, CA).
 Assistant Engineer – Don Henderson
 Mastered by Doug Sax at The Mastering Lab (Los Angeles, CA).
 Art Direction and Design – Mike Doud
 Photography – Antonin Kratochvil and Ken Veeder
 Lettering – Michael Manoogian
 Management – Ken Fritz and Dennis Turner

Certifications

References

1977 albums
George Benson albums
Albums produced by Tommy LiPuma
Warner Records albums
Albums recorded at Capitol Studios